This is a list of films which have placed number one at the weekend box office in Romania during 2016.

Highest-grossing films

See also 

 List of highest-grossing films in Romania
 List of Romanian films

Notes 

 In its third weekend, Selfie 69 became the highest-grossing Romanian film of all time.

References 

2014
2016 in Romanian cinema
Romania